Van Wert High School is a public high school in Van Wert, Ohio, United States.  It is the only high school in the Van Wert City School District. The school's athletic teams are named the Cougars and are represented by the mascot, Claw'd. The school's athletic conference is the Western Buckeye League.

Athletics

State Championships
Football: 2020

State runners-up
Football: 2000
Boys cross Country: 1988
Boys golf: 1985

State final four
Boys basketball: 1987, 1990, 1992

Notable alumni and faculty
 Charles W. Clark, baritone singer
 Weeb Ewbank, member of Pro Football Hall of Fame; began head coaching career at Van Wert
 Walter Hinton, aviation pioneer
 James S. Kemper- US Ambassador to Brazil and founder of Kemper Insurance
 Jack Lininger, football player
 Larry Smith, head football coach at Tulane, Arizona, Southern California, and Missouri; TV analyst
 Jim Young, head football coach at Arizona, Purdue, and Army

References

External links
 

High schools in Van Wert County, Ohio
Van Wert, Ohio
Public high schools in Ohio